Fever Daydream is the debut studio album by American electronic band The Black Queen. It was released independently on January 29, 2016. The album was released in Australia under Universal Music Australia and was initially limited to 1,000 copies.

Background and composition
In January 2013, Greg Puciato of The Dillinger Escape Plan revealed plans for a new project with Joshua Eustis in an interview with Revolver, later releasing a teaser video on their official homepage under the name The Black Queen in 2015.

On June 14, 2015, the band revealed the first single from their then-unnamed album, "The End Where We Start" on BBC Radio 1 Rock Show. They released its accompanying music video on their official YouTube account two days later. The single was later released physically with 233 limited edition copies made available for purchase on 12" vinyl, sold only from the band's official website.

233 limited edition 12" vinyl copies of "Ice to Never" were made available for purchase on the band's homepage. The release contains the album version of the song, a shorter "single" version, and an extended version. The music video for "Ice to Never" was released in September 2015.

Fever Daydream became available for purchase through their official Bandcamp account on January 29, 2016, limited to 1,000 copies on black vinyl and CD, as well as worldwide in independent record stores. A final version of Fever Daydream, limited to 233 copies, was released on white vinyl with an alternate cover. This cover is an inversion of the cover from the clear vinyl release.

The music of Fever Daydream has been described by music critics as new wave, dream pop, and ambient music.

Reception 

Fever Daydream received positive reviews by music critics. At Metacritic, which assigns a rating out of 100 to reviews from mainstream critics, the album has an average score of 74 based on 7 reviews, indicating "generally favorable reviews." The Independent called the album "an apocalyptic melting pot of gentle electronica and soulful R&B-inflected vocals, infused with an undercurrent of Lynchian paranoia."

Track listing

Charts

Personnel 
The Black Queen
 Greg Puciato − lead vocals, production
 Joshua Eustis − keyboards, programming, guitar, production
 Steven "Asian Steve" Alexander − keyboards, guitar, programming, production

Technical
Justin Meldal-Johnsen − executive production
Jesse Draxler − artwork and design

References

2016 albums
The Black Queen (band) albums
Universal Records albums